"Boasty" is a song by British rappers Wiley, Stefflon Don and Jamaican rapper Sean Paul featuring vocals from English actor and musician Idris Elba. It was originally released by Wiley featuring Mucky in August 2018, and remixed for release with contributions from Stefflon Don, Paul and Elba in January 2019. It reached number 11 on the UK Singles Chart in March 2019. A solo version of the track was released on the rapper's 14th studio album, Boasty Gang – The Album, which was released on 22 June 2020.

Music video
The music video, directed by Henry Scholfield, was released in March 2019, featuring Stefflon Don, Paul and Elba, with a young actor, Brooklyn Appiah, appearing in place of Wiley. Idris Elba delivers his verse in a mansion that includes a film set. Scholfield said that he wanted the video to feel like a competition between the artists "competing for lyrical screen-space" to give the "vibe of bigupmanship and a visual riff on who's the boasty-iest".

Charts

Weekly charts

Year-end charts

Certifications

References

2019 singles
2019 songs
Wiley (musician) songs
BMG Rights Management singles
Dancehall songs
Idris Elba songs
Sean Paul songs
Stefflon Don songs
Song recordings produced by Toddla T
Songs written by Idris Elba
Songs written by Toddla T
Songs written by Sean Paul
Songs written by Stefflon Don
Songs written by Wiley (musician)